Crenicichla inpa is a species of cichlid native to South America. It is found in the Amazon River basin, and reported from a large area of the Amazon River basin in Brazil.

References

inpa
Freshwater fish of Brazil
Fish of the Amazon basin
Taxa named by Alex Ploeg
Fish described in 1991